Puzur-Ishtar (Puzur4-Eš4-tár, c. 2050–2025 BCE) was a ruler of the city of Mari, northern Mesopotamia, after the fall of the Akkadian Empire. He was contemporary of the Third Dynasty of Ur, and probably their vassal.

He had several sons, who succeeded him, Hitlal-Erra and Hanun-Dagan.

Statue
A statue of him is known from the Royal Palace of Mari. Statues of gods and past rulers were the most common among statues unearthed at the Palace of Zimri-Lin. The title of Shakkanakku (military governor) was borne by all the princes of a dynasty who reigned at Mari in the late third millennium and early second millennium BC. These kings were the descendants of the military governors appointed by the kings of Akkad.

The statue of Puzur-Ishtar once stood in one of the sanctuaries of the Palace of Zimri-Lim, but was discovered in the museum of Nebuchadrezzar’s palace at Babylon (604-562 BCE), where it was likely transported as a trophy. The inscription on the hem of the statue’s skirt mentions Puzur-Ishtar, Sakkanakku of Mari, and also mentions his brother the priest Milaga. Horned caps are usually limited to divine representations in Mesopotamian art but they do not occur on depictions of kings during the Ur III period, therefore it is considered that perhaps the horns of divinity on Puzur-Ishtar’s cap qualified him (to the Babylonian soldiers) as a god to be carted home as the ultimate symbol of their victory over the people of Mari.

Inscriptions
The inscription on the arm of the statue reads:

The inscription on the hem of the statue reads:

Other statues
A second statue of Puzur-Ishtar is known, now in the Museum of Ancient Near East, Berlin.

References

21st-century BC rulers
Kings of Mari
21st-century BC people